Ethiopian Airlines Flight 961 was a scheduled flight serving the route Addis Ababa–Nairobi–Brazzaville–Lagos–Abidjan.  On 23 November 1996, the aircraft serving the flight, a Boeing 767-200ER, was hijacked en route from Addis Ababa to Nairobi by three Ethiopians seeking asylum in Australia. The plane crash-landed in the Indian Ocean near Grande Comore, Comoros Islands, due to fuel exhaustion; 125 of the 175 passengers and crew on board, including the three hijackers, died.  This is the first recorded instance of a partially successful water landing utilizing a wide-body aircraft. Although Pan Am Flight 6 in 1956 successfully executed a water landing (in which all passengers on board survived), the plane involved in that incident was a narrow-body Boeing 377 Stratocruiser.

Aircraft and crew

Aircraft 
The aircraft involved in the crash was a Boeing 767-260ER, registration ET-AIZ, c/n 23916, that had its maiden flight on 17 September 1987. Powered by two Pratt & Whitney JT9D-7R4E engines, it was delivered new to Ethiopian Airlines on 22 October 1987. It was nine years old at the time the incident took place.

Crew 
Captain Leul Abate (42), an experienced pilot with over 11,500 total flight hours (including 4,067 hours in the Boeing 757/767), was the pilot-in-command. The first officer on the flight was Yonas Mekuria (34). He had flown more than 6,500 hours, 3,042 of them in the Boeing 757/767.

Prior to the crash, Leul had experienced two previous hijackings. The first occurred 12 April 1992 on Flight ETH574, a Boeing 727-260. Two hijackers with hand grenades demanded to be taken to Nairobi and onwards to Canada. After a five-hour standoff at Jomo Kenyatta International Airport the hijackers surrendered. The second occurred on 17 March 1995, flying a Boeing 737-260. Five hijackers demanded to be taken to Libya, and the airplane was diverted to El Obeid, Sudan. There the hijackers changed their mind and wanted to fly to Sweden instead. However, the Sudanese authorities refused to refuel the aircraft, and after several hours of standoff the hijackers surrendered. In both cases, the aircraft were undamaged and nobody was injured or killed.

Description

Departure 
The flight had been delayed in order to wait for a connecting flight. The aircraft took off at 08:09 UTC.

Hijacking
At about 08:29 UTC, when the aircraft, referred to as Zulu by Ethiopian Airlines' pilots, after the last letter of its registration, was 20 minutes into the flight, three Ethiopian men charged the cockpit and hijacked the aircraft after taking an axe and a fire extinguisher from the cockpit. Ethiopian state-operated radio later identified the hijackers as two unemployed high-school graduates and a nurse; their names were Alemayehu Bekeli Belayneh, Mathias Solomon Belay, and Sultan Ali Hussein (they did not say who had which description).

The men threatened to blow the plane up in flight if the pilots did not obey their demands. The hijackers said that there were eleven of them when in fact there were only three. After assaulting and forcing first officer Yonas Mekuria into the cabin, they made an announcement. Over the intercom, they declared in Amharic, French and English that if anyone tried to interfere, they had a bomb and they would use it to blow up the plane. Authorities later determined that the purported bomb was actually a covered bottle of liquor.

The hijackers demanded the plane be flown to Australia. Leul tried to explain they had only taken on the fuel needed for the Addis Ababa to Nairobi sector and thus could not even make a quarter of the journey to Australia, but the hijackers did not believe him. One of them pointed out a statement in the airline's in-flight magazine that the maximum flying time of the 767 was 11 hours. 

Captain Leul later commented: 

Instead of flying towards Australia, the captain followed the African coastline southward. The hijackers noticed that land was still visible and forced the pilot to steer east. Leul secretly headed for the Comoro Islands, which lie midway between Madagascar and the African mainland. During this time two of the hijackers went into the cabin, with the lead hijacker (as stated in the report) staying in the cockpit.

Crash landing

The plane was nearly out of fuel as it approached the island group, but the hijackers continued to ignore the captain's warnings. Out of options, Leul began to circle the area, hoping to land the plane at the Comoros' main airport.

At 11:41 UTC the right engine flamed out. The hijacker briefly exited into the cabin to talk with the other hijackers. Leul took this opportunity to make use of the aircraft's public address system and made the following announcement:

Hearing this, the lead hijacker returned to the cockpit and knocked Leul's microphone out of his hand. Shortly after this, the left engine flamed out, forcing the 767 to glide. The cockpit voice recorder (CVR) then recorded the following (lowercase words were spoken in Amharic while words typed in uppercase were spoken in English):

Leul's sentence was cut off as the CVR and flight data recorder (FDR) both stopped recording at this point due to both engines having flamed out.

Leul tried to make an emergency landing at Prince Said Ibrahim International Airport on Grande Comore, but a fight with the hijackers at the last minute caused him to lose his visual point of reference, leaving him unable to locate the airport. Leul attempted to land parallel with the waves instead of against the waves in an effort to smooth the landing. Seconds prior to contacting the water, the aircraft was banked left some ten degrees; the left engine and wingtip struck the water first. The engine acted as a scoop and struck a coral reef, slowing that side of the aircraft quickly and causing the Boeing 767 to suddenly tilt left. The rest of the aircraft then entered the water unevenly, causing it to break apart. Except for the rear part of the airframe, the broken portions of the fuselage sank rapidly. Many passengers died because they prematurely inflated their life jackets in the cabin, causing them to be trapped inside by the sinking plane.

Island residents and tourists, including a group of scuba divers and some French and Indian doctors on vacation, came to the aid of crash survivors. A tourist recorded a video of ET-AIZ crashing. She said that she had begun taping because she initially believed that the 767 formed a part of an air show for tourists.

Medical treatment and repatriation of bodies
Survivors were initially taken to Mitsamiouli Hospital. The passengers were transferred to El-Maarouf Regional Hospital Centre in Moroni the same day. The two French people who survived and 19 injured were transported to Réunion. In Réunion, one of the injured died, making the death toll 125. Excluding those transported to Réunion, survivors were transported to Kenya and South Africa.

At the time there was no mortuary in Moroni, so cold rooms were used to store 124 bodies.

Investigation

On 3 December 1996 the General Directorate of Civil Aviation of the Comoros agreed to delegate the investigation of ET961 to the Ethiopian Civil Aviation Authority (ECAA). The Air Accidents Investigation Branch (AAIB) analysed the flight recorders.

Fate of the passengers and crew
The final accident report includes a listing of surviving and dead passengers and crew. All 12 crew members were Ethiopians. Six survived, including the pilot and copilot.

The passengers originated from 36 countries.

The passenger manifest (including hijackers but not crew members) follows:

The dead passenger count includes the three hijackers.
Of the passengers, 42 originated in Bombay, including:
 3 Americans
 9 Nigerians
 9 Sri Lankans
 19 Indians

The rest of the passengers originated in Addis Ababa.

Of the 175 passengers and crew members, 125 were killed, including the three hijackers. According to the accident report, all six surviving crew members and 38 passengers received serious injuries, two passengers received minor injuries, and four passengers received no injuries. One passenger, an Ethiopian, was identified as a child on the manifest; this passenger was among the dead.

Many of the passengers survived the initial crash, but they had disregarded or did not hear Leul's warning not to inflate their life jackets inside the aircraft, causing them to be pushed against the ceiling of the fuselage by the inflated life jackets when water flooded in. Unable to escape, they drowned. An estimated 60 to 80 passengers, strapped to their seats, presumably drowned.

Leul and Yonas both survived. For his actions, Leul was awarded the Flight Safety Foundation Professionalism in Flight Safety Award.

Notable passengers
Among those killed was Mohamed Amin, a wartime photojournalist and publisher of Selamta, Ethiopian Airlines' in-flight magazine. He was believed to be standing near the entrance to the cockpit arguing or negotiating with the hijacker presumed to be guarding the cockpit during the final moments of the flight.

Franklin Huddle, the U.S. Consul General of Bombay at the time, and his wife both survived the crash. Huddle said that he chose to fly on Ethiopian Airlines while planning a safari trip to Kenya because of the airline's reputation; it was one of the few airlines in Africa to have Federal Aviation Administration certification. Huddle wanted a flight during the day, reasoning that flying during the day was "safer". He credits his and his wife's survival to a last-minute upgrade to business class.

Maps

Aftermath
A memorial service was held in Galawa on 30 November 1996.

The incident has become a well-known hijacking because of the videotape. This was one of very few large airliner water landings, and was the first hijacked water landing. Both the captain and first officer of the flight received aviation awards, and both continued to fly for Ethiopian Airlines, although Leul considers Yonas, the first officer, the real hero. Yonas fought the hijackers while he himself was bruised and bleeding, giving time for Leul to land the airplane. "He was a life-saver", Leul said.

In the media
The crash was featured in an episode of the TV show Mayday with the title "Ocean Landing"; the episode is from season 3, episode 12.

It was also featured in a 2010 episode of the Biography Channel series I Survived..., in which a survivor told his story of what happened on the plane.

See also

 Air Canada Flight 143
 1990 Guangzhou Baiyun airport collisions
 Tuninter Flight 1153, an ATR 72 ditched into the Mediterranean Sea after a fuel exhaustion
 US Airways Flight 1549
 Ethiopian Airlines accidents and incidents
 List of accidents and incidents involving commercial aircraft
 List of airline flights that required gliding

Notes

References

External links

Final Incident Report (Archive Alt archive) - Ethiopian Civil Aviation Authority - Includes list of passengers, surviving and deceased
 "Milestones". (Archive) Time. 9 December 1996. – Announcement of deaths of Mohammed Amin and Brian Tetley
 "Rescuers continue search for victims of hijacked plane". (Archive) Associated Press at the Lubbock Avalanche-Journal. 1996.
The Hijacking of Ethiopian Airlines Flight 961 (Criminal Acts Against Civil Aviation – 1996, FAA) (Archive Alt archive)

1996 in the Comoros
1996 in Ethiopia
Accidents and incidents involving the Boeing 767
Airliner accidents and incidents caused by fuel exhaustion
Aircraft hijackings in Africa
Airliner accidents and incidents caused by hijacking
Airliner accidents and incidents involving ditching
Aviation accidents and incidents in 1996
Aviation accidents and incidents in the Comoros
961
Mass murder in 1996
Mass murder in Africa
November 1996 crimes
Terrorist incidents in Africa in 1996
Terrorist incidents in Ethiopia
Terrorist incidents in Ethiopia in the 1990s
Aircraft hijackings